Patrick Jan Mtiliga (born 28 January 1981) is a Danish retired professional footballer and currently the sporting director of B.93. He played as a defender, most frequently used as a left-back. He played six games for the Denmark national team.

Club career 
Patrick Mtiliga was born in Copenhagen to a Tanzanian father. He started playing youth football for Copenhagen club Boldklubben 1893 (B 93). He initially played as a striker or attacking midfielder. He made his senior debut for B 93 in the 1998–99 Danish Superliga season. After 13 league games for the club, he moved abroad to join Dutch club Feyenoord Rotterdam in the Eredivisie championship in the summer 1999.

Dutch years 
He was initially loaned out from Feyenoord to feeder club Excelsior Rotterdam in the lower league Eerste Divisie, for an indefinite period of time. He established himself in the Excelsior first team squad during his first year at the club. He went on to play  seasons for Excelsior, helping the club win promotion for the Eredivisie in the 2001–02 season, though they were relegated again in the very next season. In the 2003–04 season, he secured himself a place in the Excelsior starting line-up, where he played 23 games. Halfway through the 2003–04 season, he was finally called into the Feyenoord squad. He finished the season playing 11 games in the Eredivisie for the club. The following year, his Feyenoord career came to a halt. He played 11 league games in his first full season for Feyenoord, as he incurred a serious hip injury in January 2005. As he recovered by January 2006, Feyenoord looked to loan him out again, while Mtiliga opted to spend the remainder of the season with the reserve team.

In August 2006, Mtiliga moved on to Eredivise rivals NAC Breda, signing a one-year contract, with an option for extension. After a success-filled period at NAC, he extended his contract by two-and-a-half years in January 2007. He played 30 of 34 games, as NAC was the surprise of the year and finished third in the 2007–08 Eredivisie. He established himself as one of the best left-backs in the Eredivisie, and was included in team of the week on several occasions. When his contract expired in the summer 2009, he was approached by a number of clubs.

Málaga 
He signed a contract with Málaga CF in the Spanish La Liga championship in the summer 2009. He was injured in his first league game for the club, and had a hard time forcing his way back into the starting line-up. He was asked to take a more attacking approach by manager Juan Ramón López Muñiz, and soon reasserted himself in the first team. In a 24 January 2010 away match against Real Madrid, Cristiano Ronaldo broke Mtiliga's nose by hitting him in the face with his elbow. Ronaldo was shown a red card and it was reported that Mtiliga would be out of the game for three weeks. On 30 June 2011, his contract with the Andalusians expired and he left the club.

Nordsjælland 
On 4 August 2011, it was confirmed that he would be returning to Denmark after 13 years abroad, as he signed a two-year contract with Danish club FC Nordsjælland that plays in the Danish top-division Danish Superliga. He made his league debut for FCN on 11 September 2011, in a 2–1 win over AaB.

Mtiliga announced his retirement from football on 28 August 2017, and played his final professional match on 10 December in a 3–2, coming off as a 90th-minute substitute for Andreas Skovgaard in a 3–2 home win over Hobro IK.

International career 
Mtiliga debuted for the Danish under-17 national team in August 1997. He has played a total 28 national youth team matches and scored four goals, including nine games and a single goal for the Denmark under-21 national team.

In his time at Feyenoord, Mtiliga was touted as a coming Danish international by manager Ruud Gullit . Though he played well for NAC Breda, he felt overlooked by the national team in spring 2008. In November 2008, he was called up for the senior Denmark national team by national manager Morten Olsen. He made his debut against Wales, but was then dropped from the national team. In May 2010, he was included in Olsen's preliminary Danish squad selection for the 2010 FIFA World Cup. Although his inclusion came as a surprise to some, Olsen found that Mtiliga's move to Malaga had improved his competitive level.
On 28 May 2010, Mtiliga was included in Olsen's "Final List" of 23 to play in the 2010 FIFA World Cup. It was expected prior to the announcement of the "Final List", that the squad was to include either Mtiliga or defense colleague Simon Busk Poulsen, but eventually both players were sent off to South Africa. He failed to make an appearance, though, in the World Cup finals, as Denmark finished third in their group and were eventually knocked out from the tournament.

6 December 2011, Mtiliga was called up for Denmark's tour of Thailand in January.

Post-playing career
A half year after retiring at the end of 2017, Mtiliga was appointed as the sporting director of his former club B.93.

References

External links

Voetbal International profile 
Danish Superliga statistics 
bold.dk

1981 births
Living people
Footballers from Copenhagen
Danish men's footballers
Association football fullbacks
Denmark international footballers
Denmark youth international footballers
Denmark under-21 international footballers
2010 FIFA World Cup players
Eerste Divisie players
Eredivisie players
La Liga players
Danish Superliga players
Boldklubben af 1893 players
Feyenoord players
Excelsior Rotterdam players
NAC Breda players
Málaga CF players
FC Nordsjælland players
Danish people of Tanzanian descent
Danish expatriate men's footballers
Danish expatriate sportspeople in the Netherlands
Expatriate footballers in the Netherlands
Danish expatriate sportspeople in Spain
Expatriate footballers in Spain